Nesolagus is a genus of rabbits containing three species of striped rabbit: the Annamite striped rabbit, the Sumatran striped rabbit, and the extinct species N. sinensis. Overall there is very little known about the genus as a whole, most information coming from the Sumatran rabbit.

Species
The genus Nesolagus includes three species, one extinct:
 Sumatran striped rabbit, Nesolagus netscheri
 Annamite striped rabbit, Nesolagus timminsi
 Nesolagus sinensis, early Pleistocene of China.

Behavior
Due to the small number of individuals, and because of the rare sightings of this genus, there is not much information available on its behavior. One thing that we do know however, is that the Sumatran rabbit is nocturnal and hides out in burrows which it does not make itself and does not really like to go out looking for food for itself in places that are too far from its home.

Description
Descriptions of the species are partly based on images made by camera traps; for the Sumatran striped rabbit the cameras were set in the montane forests of Sumatra, while the Annamite Striped rabbit was seen in the Annamite mountain range of Laos and Vietnam. Both species of striped rabbit have seven brown or black stripes and a red rump and white underside.  They are the only species of rabbits to have stripes. They are relatively small with a length of about 368–417 mm, with a tail of about 17 mm and ears about 43–45 mm long. Thus the ears of Nesolagus are only about half as long as in most rabbits, e.g. in the genus Lepus. Their fur is soft and dense, overlaid by longer, harsher hairs.

Distribution
Striped rabbits are found in only four locations. The Sumatran striped rabbit has been found in the Barisan Mountains in western Sumatra, Indonesia, and the Annamite striped rabbit has been found in the Annamite mountains on the border between Vietnam and Laos. The fossils (parts of the left mandible with several teeth) of the extinct Nesolagus sinensis were found in Chongzou Ecological Park in the Guangnxi Zhuang region of southwest China.

References

Mammals of Indonesia
Mammal genera
Taxa named by Charles Immanuel Forsyth Major
Leporidae